Chinon may refer to 
 a town in France, see Chinon
 a castle in Chinon, France, see Château de Chinon
 a wine from the vineyards around the town of Chinon in Loire Valley, see Chinon (AOC)
Château-Chinon (disambiguation), two communes of the Nièvre département, in France.
Chinon Industries, Japanese camera manufacturer.

Not to be confused with:
Quinone - a class of organic compounds. (Chinon is the German and Polish term for one unspecific molecule from among the quinones.)